Kevin Paul Teer (born 7 December 1963) is an English retired professional football midfielder who played in the Football League for Brentford.

Career 
Teer began his career in the youth team at Third Division club Brentford. He made one professional appearance for the club, coming on for Gary Roberts during a 0–0 league draw with Swindon Town on 2 May 1981. Teer failed to be offered a professional contract and departed at the end of the 1980–81 season.

Career statistics

References

1964 births
Living people
English footballers
Footballers from Wood Green
Brentford F.C. players
English Football League players
Association football midfielders